Elections were held in Renfrew County, Ontario on October 24, 2022 in conjunction with municipal elections across the province.

Renfrew County Council
County council has no direct elections; its membership is made up of the mayors and reeves of the lower-tier municipalities of the county (including the reeves - rather than mayors - of Deep River, Laurentian Valley and Renfrew), while Arnpror elects a separate councillor for county council. Therefore, elections in those municipalities determine the members of council for the new term.

Admaston Bromley

Mayor
The following were the results for mayor of Admaston Bromley.

Arnprior
The following were the results for mayor and county councillor of Arnprior.

Mayor
Incumbent mayor Walter Stack was challenged by town councillor Lisa McGee, and Mike Defalco.

County councillor

Bonnechere Valley

Mayor
Mayor Jennifer Murphy was challenged by former mayor Zig Mintha, 2018 Ontario general election Liberal candidate Jackie Agnew and political newcomer Leanne Panke.

Brudenell, Lyndoch and Raglan

Mayor
The following were the results for mayor of Brudenell, Lyndoch and Raglan.

Deep River
The following were the results for mayor and reeve of Deep River.

Mayor

Reeve

Greater Madawaska

Mayor
The following were the results for mayor of Greater Madawaska.

Head, Clara and Maria

Mayor
The following were the results for mayor of Head, Clara and Maria.

Horton

Mayor
David Bennett was re-elected by acclamation as mayor of Horton.

Killaloe, Hagarty and Richards

Mayor
The following were the results for mayor of Killaloe, Hagarty and Richards.

Laurentian Hills

Mayor
Deputy mayor Anne Giardini was elected as mayor by acclamation.

Laurentian Valley
The following were the results for mayor and reeve of Laurentian Valley.

Mayor
Mayor Steven Bennett was re-elected by acclamation for a third straight term.

Reeve

Madawaska Valley

Mayor
The following were the results for mayor of Madawaska Valley.

McNab/Braeside

Mayor
The following were the results for mayor of McNab/Braeside.

North Algona Wilberforce

Mayor
Incumbent mayor James Brose was challenged by former mayor Deborah Farr.

Petawawa

Mayor
The following were the results for mayor of Petawawa.

Renfrew
The following were the results for mayor and reeve of Renfrew.

Mayor
Running for mayor of Renfrew were former mayor and incumbent councillor Sandi Heins, incumbent councillor Tom Sidney and controversial fringe candidate Callum Scott.

Reeve

Whitewater Region
The following were the results for mayor of Whitewater Region.

Until 2022, Whitewater Region elected a reeve which sat of Renfrew County Council. In 2021, it was decided to replace the position with a deputy mayor, and have the mayor sit on County Council instead.

Mayor
Outspoken government critic and president of the Renfrew County Landowner's Association Donna Burns ran against councillor Neil Nicholson.

References

Renfrew
Politics of Renfrew County